Kurt Kaiser (3 November 1906 – 24 May 1970), better known as Sydney John Kay, was a German-born composer, musician and theatre entrepreneur.

Biography

Germany
Born in Leipzig, Germany of Peruvian-Jewish descent, he originally pursued an engineering career in Berlin, but in 1927 he joined the German-Jewish showband The Weintraub Syncopators as a musician. He appeared with them supporting Marlene Dietrich in The Blue Angel (1930). After the Nazi's came to power in 1933, the Syncopators went on a world tour, and were in Sydney when war was declared.

Australian career
Kaiser was interned during the early days of the war, but was eventually released, changing his name in honour of his new home, Sydney. He became musical director for the Colgate-Palmolive radio unit, and was involved in theatre, running Sydney's Theatre for Children (1944–45) and co-founding the Mercury Theatre with Peter Finch. He produced the famous production of Molière's The Imaginary Invalid that was seen by Laurence Olivier and Vivien Leigh which led to them inviting Peter Finch to England.

Kay also composed for various Australian films, documentaries, orchestras and ballets.

Move to England
He then moved to England where he worked steadily in British film and television. He also composed for the stage.

Selected credits
The Blue Angel (1930) – musician
Harvest Gold (1945) – composer
A Son is Born (1946) – composer
Bush Christmas (1947) – composer
Captain Thunderbolt (1953) – composer
The Back of Beyond (1954) – composer
The Adventures of Long John Silver (1955) (TV series) – composer
The Adventures of William Tell (1958) (TV series) – composer

References

External links

Sydney John Kay Australian theatre credits at AusStage
Sydney John Kay at National Film and Sound Archive

Jewish emigrants from Nazi Germany to Australia
Jewish composers
1906 births
1970 deaths
Australian male composers
Australian composers
Musicians from Sydney
Australian theatre managers and producers
20th-century German composers
20th-century Australian musicians
20th-century German male musicians